Oscar Peterson Plays the Duke Ellington Song book is a 1959 album by pianist Oscar Peterson of compositions written or performed by Duke Ellington. Peterson had recorded many of the pieces for his 1952 album Oscar Peterson Plays Duke Ellington, and had recently performed with Ella Fitzgerald on her 1957 album, Ella Fitzgerald Sings the Duke Ellington Song book

Track listing

Personnel

Performance
Oscar Peterson – piano
Ray Brown – double bass
Ed Thigpen – drums

References

1959 albums
Oscar Peterson albums
Albums produced by Norman Granz
Verve Records albums
Duke Ellington tribute albums